Kioconus is a synonym of the subgenus Conus (Splinoconus) da Motta, 1991 represented as Conus Linnaeus, 1758. These are sea snails, marine gastropod mollusks in the family Conidae, the cone snails and their allies.

Distinguishing characteristics
The Tucker & Tenorio 2009 taxonomy distinguishes Kioconus from Conus in the following ways:

 Genus Conus sensu stricto Linnaeus, 1758
 Shell characters (living and fossil species)
The basic shell shape is conical to elongated conical, has a deep anal notch on the shoulder, a smooth periostracum and a small operculum. The shoulder of the shell is usually nodulose and the protoconch is usually multispiral. Markings often include the presence of tents except for black or white color variants, with the absence of spiral lines of minute tents and textile bars.
Radular tooth (not known for fossil species)
The radula has an elongated anterior section with serrations and a large exposed terminating cusp, a non-obvious waist, blade is either small or absent and has a short barb, and lacks a basal spur.
Geographical distribution
These species are found in the Indo-Pacific region.
Feeding habits
These species eat other gastropods including cones.

 the former genus Kioconus da Motta, 1991
Shell characters (living and fossil species)
The shell is obconic with flat sides and carinate shoulders.  The spire is only slightly scalariform.  The protoconch is multispiral.  The shell is ornamented with well developed cords on the whorl tops, and nodules which may persist or die out early.  The anal notch is moderate to deep.  The periostracum is tufted and ridged, and the operculum is moderate in size.
Radular tooth (not known for fossil species)
The anterior section of the radular tooth is roughly equal in length with the posterior section, and the blade covers between one-third to more than half the length of the anterior section.  A basal spur is present, the barb is short, and the denticles are coarse.
Geographical distribution
The species in this genus occur in the Indo-Pacific region including Australia and South Africa.
Feeding habits
These cone snails are vermivorous, meaning that the cones prey on polychaete worms.

Species list
This list of species is based on the information in the World Register of Marine Species (WoRMS) list. Species within the genus Kioconus include:
 Kioconus alconnelli (da Motta, 1986): synonym of  Conus alconnelli da Motta, 1986
 Kioconus caillaudii (Kiener, 1845): synonym of  Conus caillaudii Kiener, 1845
 Kioconus capreolus (Röckel, 1985): synonym of  Conus capreolus Röckel, 1985
 Kioconus dayriti (Röckel & da Motta, 1983): synonym of  Conus dayriti Röckel & da Motta, 1983
 Kioconus estivali (Moolenbeek & Richard, 1995): synonym of  Conus estivali Moolenbeek & Richard, 1995
 Kioconus gloriakiiensis (Kuroda & Itô, 1961): synonym of  Conus gloriakiiensis Kuroda & Itô, 1961
 Kioconus gondwanensis (Röckel & Moolenbeek, 1995): synonym of  Conus gondwanensis Röckel & Moolenbeek, 1995
 Kioconus hirasei (Kuroda, 1956): synonym of  Conus hirasei (Kuroda, 1956)
 Kioconus lenavati (da Motta & Röckel, 1982): synonym of  Conus lenavati da Motta & Röckel, 1982
 Kioconus martensi (E.A. Smith, 1884): synonym of  Conus martensi E. A. Smith, 1884
 Kioconus nielsenae (Marsh, 1962): synonym of  Conus nielsenae Marsh, 1962
 Kioconus papuensis (Coomans & Moolenbeek, 1982): synonym of  Conus papuensis Coomans & Moolenbeek, 1982
 Kioconus plinthis (Richard & Moolenbeek, 1988): synonym of  Conus plinthis Richard & Moolenbeek, 1988
 Kioconus queenslandis (da Motta, 1984): synonym of  Conus queenslandis da Motta, 1984
 Kioconus recluzianus (Bernardi, 1853): synonym of  Conus recluzianus Bernardi, 1853
 Kioconus reductaspiralis (Walls, 1979): synonym of  Conus reductaspiralis Walls, 1979
 Kioconus roseorapum (G. Raybaudi & da Motta, 1990): synonym of  Conus roseorapum G. Raybaudi & da Motta, 1990
 Kioconus sazanka (Shikama, 1970): synonym of  Conus sazanka Shikama, 1970
 Kioconus shikamai (Coomans, Moolenbeek & Wils, 1985): synonym of  Conus shikamai Coomans, Moolenbeek & Wils, 1985
 Kioconus sugimotonis (Kuroda, 1928): synonym of  Conus sugimotonis Kuroda, 1928
 Kioconus thevenardensis (da Motta, 1987): synonym of  Conus thevenardensis da Motta, 1987
 Kioconus tribblei (Walls, 1977): synonym of  Conus tribblei Walls, 1977
 Kioconus typhon (Kilburn, 1975): synonym of  Conus typhon Kilburn, 1975
 Kioconus voluminalis (Reeve, 1843): synonym of  Conus voluminalis Reeve, 1843

References

Further reading 
 Kohn A. A. (1992). Chronological Taxonomy of Conus, 1758-1840". Smithsonian Institution Press, Washington and London.
 Monteiro A. (ed.) (2007). The Cone Collector 1: 1-28.
 Berschauer D. (2010). Technology and the Fall of the Mono-Generic Family The Cone Collector 15: pp. 51-54
 Puillandre N., Meyer C.P., Bouchet P., and Olivera B.M. (2011), Genetic divergence and geographical variation in the deep-water Conus orbignyi complex (Mollusca: Conoidea)'', Zoologica Scripta 40(4) 350-363.

External links
 To World Register of Marine Species
  Gastropods.com: Conidae setting forth the genera recognized therein.

Conidae